Monetary reform is the process of fundamentally changing policies regarding money. It can include changes to the money creation process, fractional-reserve banking, financial institutions, financing of the economy and social credit among other things.

History

C. H. Douglas and the Social Credit-movement 

In the years around 1920 the British engineer C. H. Douglas developed a theory on banking and welfare distribution, a theory which he called "Social Credit", and which soon became the cornerstone of an international movement with the same name. However, Douglas himself warned against viewing the Social Credit solely as a scheme for monetary reform. Personally he preferred to describe it as "the policy of a philosophy" or, to be exact, the policy of "practical Christianity". This policy, linked to this philosophy, is all about dispersing economic and political power to individuals. As he once wrote, "Systems were made for men, and not men for systems, and the interest of man which is self-development, is above all systems, whether theological, political or economic."

Recent development and debate 

Michael Rowbotham's The Grip of Death, published 1998, was an attack on the banking system as well as the politics of globalization, free trade and growth-oriented strategies based on these lines. The book was widely spread and got reviews in magazines such as The Ecologist, Resurgence, New Internationalist, The Tribune, The Tablet, Sustainable Economics, Permaculture Magazine, Food Magazine and Social Credit. Some of the British monetary reformers, such as Michael Rowbotham, is influenced by the Social Credit-movement.

The Money Reform Party was founded by Anne Belsey from Kent in 2005 and deregistered in 2014. Belsey stood for the MRP in the 2006 Bromley and Chislehurst by-election and came last with 33 votes. She stood in Canterbury in 2010 and came last with 173 votes. Author Mark Braund recommended the MRP website "which includes a compelling explanation of the mechanics of money creation and its impact on society".

Papers
 2010 – Towards a Twenty-First Century Banking and Monetary System, Joint Submission to the Independent Commission on Banking, UK (Chair: Professor Sir John Vickers), with Ben Dyson, Tony Greenham, Josh Ryan-Collins, by the Centre for Banking, Finance and Sustainable Development, the new economics foundation, and Positive Money, submitted 19 November 2010 PDF

See also 

 List of monetary reformers
 Universal basic income in the United Kingdom

References 

Monetary reform
Reform in the United Kingdom
Economic history of the United Kingdom